The following is the discography of the hard rock band Magnum, which is headed by vocalist Bob Catley and guitarist/songwriter Tony Clarkin. Originally formed around 1972 they released their first single in 1975 (a cover of Sweets for My Sweet that did not chart) and their first album Kingdom of Madness in 1978. They continued recording and releasing albums until 1995 when they split. However, they re-formed in 2001 and have released albums every few years since. Many compilations and live albums were released in the gap, as well as Bob and Tony forming Hard Rain before re-forming Magnum with long-time keyboard player Mark Stanway.

Studio albums

Live albums

Compilation albums

There have also been many other compilations across various labels.

Charted singles

Videos and DVDs

References

Discographies of British artists
Rock music group discographies